The name Matmo has been used to name three tropical cyclones in the Western North Pacific Ocean. It means "heavy rain" in the Chamorro language. Matmo replaced Chataan after the damaging 2002 typhoon.

 Tropical Storm Matmo (2008) (T0803, 04W, Dindo)
 Typhoon Matmo (2014) (T1410, 10W, Henry)
 Severe Tropical Storm Matmo (2019) (T1422, 23W ,BOB 04)

Pacific typhoon set index articles